Saint John's City West is a parliamentary constituency located in the city of St. John's, Antigua and Barbuda.

The constituency is currently represented by Prime Minister Gaston Browne in the Antiguan House of Representatives.

There are 9 polling districts, and the counting centre is Villa Primary School.

Party branches

UPP City West Branch 
Next Antiguan general election candidate: Alister Thomas

ALP City West Branch 
Next Antiguan general election candidate: Gaston Browne

List of representatives 
Saint John's City West has had 2 Progressive Labour Movement representatives, 2 Antigua and Barbuda Labour Party representatives, and 1 United Progressive Party representative.

References 

Constituencies of Antigua and Barbuda
St. John's, Antigua and Barbuda